Tikanlı (also, Tikanly and Tikyanly) is a village and municipality in the Qabala Rayon of Azerbaijan.  It has a population of 1,850.  The municipality consists of the villages of Tikanlı and Dandıx.

References 

Populated places in Qabala District